Sorges et Ligueux en Périgord (literally Sorges and Ligueux in Périgord) is a commune in the Dordogne department of southwestern France. The municipality was established on 1 January 2016 and consists of the former communes of Sorges and Ligueux.

See also 
Communes of the Dordogne department

References 

Communes of Dordogne